This article gives a list of world championships in mind sports which usually represent the most prestigious competition for a specific board game, card game or mind sport. World championships can only be held for most games or mind sports with the ratification of an official body. Some Eastern games only have amateur world championships and separate professional competitions as can be seen for Go (list of professional Go tournaments).

Mind Sports Olympiad All-round 
World championships organized by Mind Sports Olympiad, that consist of competitions across multiple events to find the strongest games all-rounders.

Classic/traditional board games
Major world championships for classic strategy board games, such as chess or go.

Classic/traditional card/tile games
World championships in Traditional card games and tile-based games.

Mental disciplines 
Competitions using mental tests.

Modern board games 
Competitions in abstract strategy games and other modern board games.

Games made for 2 players:

Games supporting 3 or more players:

Modern card games 
Competitions in collectible card games and other modern card games.

Speaking competitions 
World championships in speaking.

Tile games 
World championships held in tile-based games include:

Word games 
World championships in word games.

Information technology 
World championships in competitive programming.

Quizzing
Quizzing competitions organized by the International Quizzing Association

See also

 Esports
 List of esports leagues and tournaments
 Mind Sports Organisation
 International Association of Memory
 World Memory Championships
 World Junior Memory Championships
 World Memory Tournament Federation
 World Mind Sports Games
 Mind Sports Olympiad
 International Philosophy Olympiad
 World cup competition
 World championship
 List of world championships
 List of world cups and world championships for juniors and youth

References 

 
Mind sports